Barbara Blewster (born July 31, 1960) is a former member of the Arizona House of Representatives. She served in the House from January 1999 through January 2001, representing district 1. She ran for a second term in 2000, but lost in the general election after making what were reported as "various comments about blacks, Indians, and Jews."

References

Republican Party members of the Arizona House of Representatives
Arizona State University alumni
1960 births
Living people